Evening (styled as (e)vening) is the third and final release in a series of EPs by American alternative/indie band Mae, following Morning and Afternoon. Copies of a limited release edition were available on the band's "Goodbye, Goodnight" tour. The EP was released in stores on March 8, 2011, bundled with a DVD recorded at the band's farewell show in Norfolk, VA.

Track listing

DVD Track listing

Note: The numbering of the track list contained in the DVD menu starts at 0.

References

External links
Mae's Official Website

2011 EPs
Mae albums